Chelsea girl may refer to:

 Chelsea Girl (album), a 1967 record by Nico
 Chelsea Girls (song), the title track from the Nico album
 Chelsea Girls, a 1966 film, by Andy Warhol featuring Nico
 "Chelsea Girl", a song from the Simple Minds album Life in a Day
 "Chelsea Girl", a song from the Ride EP Ride
 Chelsea Girl, a young women's clothing shop; which in 1991 merged with its sister operation Concept Man, now known as River Island.